This is list of film actors from Portugal.

 Beatriz Batarda (born 1974)
 Daniela Melchior (born 1996)
 Diogo Morgado (born 1981)
 Edgar Morais (born 1989)
 Joaquim de Almeida (born 1957)
 Leonor Silveira (born 1970)
 Lúcia Moniz (born 1976)
 Luis Da Silva (born 1982)
 Luís Miguel Cintra (born 1949)
 Nuno Lopes (born 1978)
 Maria de Medeiros (born 1965)
 Rita Blanco (born 1963)

See also

Lists of actors
List of Portuguese people

Portuguese
Film actors